Pavlos Vasiliou (born 28 December 1940) is a Cypriot-Greek former footballer who played as a midfielder and appeared for both the Greece and Cyprus national teams.

Career
Vasiliou made his international debut for the Greece national team on 29 November 1964 in a 1966 World Cup qualifying match against Denmark, which finished as a 4–2 win in Athens. He made seven appearances in total for the team, earning his final cap for Greece on 8 March 1967 in a friendly against Romania, which finished as a 1–2 loss in Athens. He later represented his native Cyprus, making his first appearance on 15 November 1970 in a UEFA Euro 1972 qualifying match against the Soviet Union, which finished as a 1–3 loss in Nicosia. He was capped eight times for Cyprus, making his final appearance on 10 May 1972 in a 1974 World Cup qualifying match against Portugal, which finished as a 0–1 loss in Nicosia.

Career statistics

International

References

External links
 
 
 
 
 

1940 births
Living people
People from Larnaca
Greek footballers
Greece international footballers
Cypriot footballers
Cyprus international footballers
Dual internationalists (football)
Association football midfielders
EPA Larnaca FC players
Olympiacos F.C. players
Cypriot First Division players
Super League Greece players